Jack Cichy (born May 5, 1996) is a current American football coach and former linebacker. He played college football at Wisconsin. He was drafted in the sixth round of the 2018 NFL Draft by the Tampa Bay Buccaneers.

College career
Playing for Wisconsin, Cichy recorded three consecutive sacks in the 2015 Holiday Bowl, a sequence that gained much notoriety.

Professional career

Tampa Bay Buccaneers
Cichy was drafted by the Tampa Bay Buccaneers in sixth round with the 202nd overall pick in the 2018 NFL Draft. The Buccaneers acquired the pick used to select Cichy by trading J.J. Wilcox to the Pittsburgh Steelers. He played in six games before suffering a torn ACL in Week 7, and was subsequently placed on injured reserve on October 22, 2018.

In 2019, Cichy played in four games before injuring his elbow in Week 4. He missed the next four weeks and was placed on injured reserve on October 30, 2019.

On October 13, 2020, Cichy was placed on injured reserve after sustaining a hamstring injury in Week 5. He was activated on November 28, 2020. He was waived on December 2, 2020.

New England Patriots
On December 3, 2020, Cichy was claimed off waivers by the New England Patriots. He was waived with a failed physical designation on December 9, 2020, and re-signed to the practice squad two days later.

Tampa Bay Buccaneers (second stint)
On January 2, 2021, Cichy was signed by the Tampa Bay Buccaneers off the Patriots practice squad. On January 19, 2021, Cichy was placed on injured reserve. Cichy earned a Super Bowl championship when the Buccaneers won Super Bowl LV.

Retirement

After being in free agency for the entirety of the 2021 season, he announced his retirement on February 22, 2022.

Coaching career

University of Wisconsin-Madison 
Cichy joined the University of Wisconsin staff as an offensive assistant in 2022 after volunteering during 2021.

References

External links
Tampa Bay Buccaneers bio
Wisconsin Badgers bio

1996 births
Living people
Players of American football from Milwaukee
American football linebackers
Wisconsin Badgers football players
Tampa Bay Buccaneers players
New England Patriots players